Yu Jihong (born January 1967) is a Chinese chemist and politician who is a professor at Jilin University, and an academician of the Chinese Academy of Sciences.

Yu is a representative of the 20th National Congress of the Chinese Communist Party and an alternate member of the 20th Central Committee of the Chinese Communist Party.

Biography

Yu was born in Anshan, Liaoning, in January 1967, while her ancestral home in Feicheng, Shandong. She earned a bachelor's degree in 1989, a master's degree in 1992, and a doctor's degree in 1995, all in chemistry and all from Jilin University. She was a postdoctoral fellow at the Hong Kong University of Science and Technology from 1996 to 1997 and Tohoku University from 1997 to 1998.

Starting 1995, she worked at Jilin University, where she was promoted to associate professor in 1997 and to full professor in 1999.

Honours and awards
 December 2015 Member of the Chinese Academy of Sciences (CAS) 
 November 2016 Fellow of the The World Academy of Sciences (TWAS)
 July 2019 Foreign Member of the Acadamia Europaea
 2021 Foreign Member of the Royal Swedish Academy of Sciences
 2021 Science and Technology Progress Award of the Ho Leung Ho Lee Foundation
 2022 Fellow of the Royal Society of Chemistry (RSC)

References

1967 births
Living people
People from Anshan
Scientists from Liaoning
Chinese chemists
Jilin University alumni
Academic staff of Jilin University
Members of the Chinese Academy of Sciences
Alternate members of the 20th Central Committee of the Chinese Communist Party
People's Republic of China politicians from Liaoning
Chinese Communist Party politicians from Liaoning